Abdul Mohammed Kadiri (born 7 March 1996) is a Ghanaian professional footballer who plays for Dynamo Kyiv. Kadiri can play as a centre-back or defensive midfielder.

Club career

Ashanti Gold
Kadiri played in 20 games for the defending Ghana Premier League champions Ashanti Gold S.C. in 2016. He also played in the Ghana Super Cup, which Ashanti Gold lost 1–0 to Medeama S.C.

Austria Wien
Kadiri joined FK Austria Wien on 31 August 2016. He made his debut for Wien in a 2–0 win over SV Mattersburg on 16 October 2016.

On 2 August 2018, Kadiri signed a season-long loan deal with Russian Premier League club Arsenal Tula.

Dynamo Kyiv
On 3 June 2019, Kadiri signed a contract with the Ukrainian Premier League runner-up FC Dynamo Kyiv. On 16 September 2020, he was loaned back to FC Arsenal Tula until the end of the 2020–21 season. On 5 January 2021, the loan was terminated early by Kadiri's request for family reasons. On 15 February 2022, Kadiri was loaned to Budapest Honvéd in Hungary.

In February 2023, Kadiri went on trial with Tajikistan Higher League club Istiklol.

International career
Kadiri was first called up to the Ghana national football team in the summer of 2016 by Avram Grant. He is yet to make his national team debut.

Personal life
Kadiri is of the royal bloodline of Ghana's Northern Region royal family, and had a life of wealth and privilege growing up. He has a sister and five brothers. Two of his brothers, Mohammed Fatau and Mohammed Sammed, are also professional footballers.

Career statistics

References

External links

 

1996 births
Living people
People from Obuasi
Association football defenders
Ghanaian footballers
Ghanaian expatriate footballers
Ghana Premier League players
Austrian Football Bundesliga players
Russian Premier League players
Ukrainian Premier League players
Nemzeti Bajnokság I players
Ashanti Gold SC players
FK Austria Wien players
FC Dynamo Kyiv players
FC Arsenal Tula players
FC Chornomorets Odesa players
Budapest Honvéd FC players
Expatriate footballers in Austria
Ghanaian expatriate sportspeople in Austria
Expatriate footballers in Russia
Ghanaian expatriate sportspeople in Russia
Expatriate footballers in Ukraine
Ghanaian expatriate sportspeople in Ukraine
Expatriate footballers in Hungary
Ghanaian expatriate sportspeople in Hungary